Botond Roska (born 1969) is a Hungarian medical doctor and biomedical researcher. Much of his research is on the pathways of visual perception and how to treat diseases that cause blindness.

Early life and education
Botond Roska was born in 1969 in Budapest, Hungary. His mother was a musician and his father, was a computer scientist. He learned to play the cello and studied at the Franz Liszt Academy of Music from 1985 to 1989. After a hand injury ended his cello career, he decided to study medicine and mathematics instead. He studied mathematics at Eötvös Loránd University from 1991 to 1995. He received a Doctor of Medicine from Semmelweis University in 1995 and then a PhD in neurobiology at the University of California, Berkeley.

Career
After finishing his PhD, Roska researched genetics and virology through the Harvard Society of Fellows at Harvard University and its medical school. He then went to Basel, Switzerland to establish a research group at the Friedrich Miescher Institute for Biomedical Research. In 2010 he joined the faculty at the University of Basel. He is the founding director of the Institute for Molecular and Clinical Ophthalmology Basel (IOB) in Switzerland and an advisor for the Allen Institute. He has been co-editor of the Annual Review of Neuroscience with Huda Zoghbi since 2017.

Much of Roska's research is on visual perception, including its principles and the pathways of information processing. He also researches therapies to combat visual dysfunction and restore sight to those who are visually impaired. In 2018 his research team succeeded in growing a functional, artificial retina in a laboratory.

Awards and honors
In 2019 he was awarded the  Semmelweis Budapest Award, which is the highest award given by Semmelweis University. Also in 2019 he received the Hungarian Order of Saint Stephen, the highest order of Hungary, and the Louis-Jeantet Prize for Medicine.
In 2020 he won the Körber European Science Prize for his research on a gene therapy that could potentially be used to reactivate the retinae of individuals who are blind.

Personal life
Roska enjoys listening to the music of Bach and writing mathematical proofs.

References

Living people
Scientists from Budapest
1969 births
Hungarian ophthalmologists
Hungarian neuroscientists
Franz Liszt Academy of Music alumni
Eötvös Loránd University alumni
Semmelweis University alumni
University of California, Berkeley alumni
Harvard Fellows
Academic staff of the University of Basel
Annual Reviews (publisher) editors
Fulbright alumni